Arthur Adam Housley (born August 13, 1971) is an Emmy winning American journalist, winemaker, and former professional baseball player. He worked for Fox News from 2001 until 2018.

Professional career

Baseball
A graduate of Pepperdine University, Housley played on the 1992 National Champion College World Series baseball team, and spent two summers playing for Harwich in the Cape Cod League. He was also a Junior Olympic All-American baseball player as a pitcher and hitter. He received a double bachelor's degree in political science and telecommunications from Pepperdine University. He was a two-time media fellow at the Hoover Institution at Stanford University, and received his MA in international relations from the University of Arizona. Prior to his career in television, Housley played professional baseball. He was drafted by the Montreal Expos, and played for both the Milwaukee Brewers and the Detroit Tigers minor league organizations, pitching in 97 games.

Journalism
Prior to joining FNC, Housley served as a reporter at KTXL-TV (Fox) in Sacramento, California from 1999 to 2001. He received an array of awards, including the 2001 Regional Associated Press Reporting Award and a Regional Emmy Award. In addition, he was the lead reporter for KFTY-TV from 1998 to 2000, an independent station in Santa Rosa, California. Prior to that, Housley was a live reporter for KCPM-TV (NBC) in Chico, California from 1997 to 1998, where he won a California Department of Forestry and Fire Protection Award for capturing a wanted 50,000-acre arsonist. Housley began his career as a reporter for KVON-KVYN radio in his native Napa, where he developed and produced newscasts.

Housley reported during the Iraq War from Kuwait, Iraq, Bahrain, Jordan and the Persian Gulf. He has spent time covering the War on terror from Pakistan and in Israel, the West Bank and Gaza Strip. He was on air in Kuwait when the first missiles and warning sirens began on March 20, 2003, and earlier that month boarded ships in the Persian Gulf along with U.S. Special Forces as they looked for illegal shipments of weapons into Iraq. His reports also came via video phone from the deck of USS Milius, a destroyer that would eventually fire the first missiles into Iraq to begin the war.

During his tenure, Housley was also FNC's lead reporter for Arnold Schwarzenegger's 2003 campaign and has covered six hurricanes, including Katrina and Rita, and filed more than 45 stories from Mexico and the southern border.

In December 2005, Housley was one of a few reporters selected to witness the execution of murderer Stanley Williams at San Quentin.

Housley also reported live on the shooting at the Los Angeles International Airport, the suspension of New York Yankees third baseman Alex Rodriguez, and the aftermath of the crash of Asiana Airlines Flight 214 live from the San Francisco Airport. Previously, he covered the 2012 wildfires in Waldo Canyon, Colorado In April 2013, he secured an exclusive interview with a special operations whistleblower regarding the 2012 Benghazi attack on September 11.

Housley has covered stories in six Latin American countries: Nicaragua, Venezuela, El Salvador, Colombia, Mexico, Chile and Guyana (reporting on the "war on drugs" and interviewing the Sandinista National Liberation Front leader Daniel Ortega). He was also live on air when Venezuelan President Hugo Chávez shut down Latin American broadcaster RCTV, and spent two weeks covering the unrest.

He received a master's degree in international security from the University of Arizona in 2014.

Notable coverage
Housley was one of the first correspondents on assignment in Haiti, covering the devastation left in the wake of the earthquake that struck it on January 12, 2010. He wound up using a plug-in mic he found at the Consumer Electronics show the week earlier to record reports shot on his iPhone. Housley and his cameraman, Eric Barnes, were able to turn rescue footage shot by Congressman Kendrick Meek (D-FL) into broadcast news.

Housley was one of the first Western journalists to provide extensive onsite coverage in the wake of the Southeast Asian tsunami. He reported on recovery efforts and the search for bodies along with his crew on location from Phuket, Patong Beach, Phi Phi Island and Khao Lak.

Housley was one of the first American reporters on scene in Japan to cover the devastation following the 9.0 earthquake and subsequent tsunami. He and his crew at one point got within 70 miles of the reactors, filming live streaming reports for Fox News before the nuclear threat forced them to return to Tokyo. Among others, his coverage was featured in the Los Angeles Times, Mecklermedia and The Napa Register.

Fluent in Spanish, Housley covered the 2010 Copiapó mining accident for Fox. He was on site and reporting on October 12–13, 2010, as each of the 33 miners, trapped for 69 days, was brought to the surface one at a time in a rescue capsule.

During the protests in August and November 2014 regarding the death of Mike Brown, Housley was one of the reporters for Fox on the scene in Ferguson, Missouri. He reported live as the fires were still burning on Florissant Avenue, and some of his tweets prompted viewers to donate money to local businesses whose property was damaged during the protests and subsequent fires.

Housley was one of the first reporters in the world on site for the December 2015 San Bernardino attack in San Bernardino. He and his crew obtained exclusive video of the shootout that ended with the gunmen, Rizwan Farook and Tashfeen Malik, being shot and killed by police. He also broke a number of major developments in the case, including the plan to charge an accomplice, Enrique Marquez Jr., with terror-related offenses, federal investigators looking for a missing hard drive, the FBI knew of terror connections early on, and Farook and Malik practiced at a local gun range.

On August 23, 2018, Politico reported that Housley was leaving Fox News, due to his frustration with hard-news reporting being de-emphasized in favor of commentary regarding President Donald Trump.

Winery owner
After a career in baseball and news, Housley began running his family winery, Century Oak. They opened a tasting room in Napa called Housley Napa Valley.

Personal life

Housley married actress Tamera Mowry on May 15, 2011. Housley is president of his family's Century Oak Winery in Lodi, California. The couple welcomed their first child, son Aden, on November 12, 2012. The couple welcomed their second child, daughter Ariah, on July 1, 2015.

In 2016, the couple competed and won the Celebrity Cupcake Wars on Food Network. Their jalapeño cornbread, chocolate cabernet and vanilla port cupcakes beat out three other teams for the title. The Housleys donated their winnings to the charity SnowballExpress.org, which helps children of fallen U.S. military members.

In January 2021, the Housleys competed and won Celebrity Game Face, a television game show hosted by actor Kevin Hart on the E!. The couple donated their winnings to alainasvoice.org, the charity named in honor of their niece.

Housley's niece, Alaina Housley, was killed during the Thousand Oaks shooting on November 7, 2018.

References

1972 births
Baseball players from California
American male journalists
American Protestants
Living people
American television journalists
Fox News people
Pepperdine University alumni
University of Arizona alumni
People from Napa, California
Hoover Institution people
Pepperdine Waves baseball players
Corpus Christi Barracudas players
Fayetteville Generals players
Lakeland Tigers players
Beloit Snappers players